Masad (lit. foundation) is a community settlement in northern Israel. Located to the west of the Sea of Galilee, it falls under the jurisdiction of Lower Galilee Regional Council.

History
The village was founded as Har Kotz in 1983 and later named after a bible verse, dealing with the building of Salomon's palace: "All these structures ... from foundation to eaves werde made of high-grade-stone." (1 Kings 7:9)

Plans to build a quarry on Mount Kotz were rejected by the National Planning and Construction Council in 2008 after protests staged by the residents of Masad and the nearby Arab village of Eilabun.

Nature reserve
Masad is surrounded by the Har Kotz Nature Reserve. Among the trees found there are  carob, mastic, Valonia oak, Christ's Thorn, Palestine oak, and Jerusalem thorn. The nature reserve derives its name from Mount Qotz (292 m), named for a priestly family that migrated to the Galilee from Jerusalem after the destruction of the Second Temple.

See also
Nature reserves in Israel

References

External links
Village website 

Community settlements
Populated places in Northern District (Israel)
Populated places established in 1983
1983 establishments in Israel